The 2018 French Indoor Athletics Championships was the 47th edition of the national championship in indoor track and field for France, organised by the French Athletics Federation. It was held on 17–18 February at the Arena Stade Couvert de Liévin in Liévin. A total of 28 events (divided evenly between the sexes) were contested over the two-day competition.

Results

Men

Women

References

Results
 Results. French Athletics Federation  

French Indoor Athletics Championships
French Indoor Athletics Championships
French Indoor Athletics Championships
French Indoor Athletics Championships
Sport in Pas-de-Calais